The Araguari River is the primary river of Amapá state in north-eastern Brazil. It became famous among surfers when some decided to ride its constant tidal bore, characterizing waves that can last for several minutes. In 2013, three dams were built in the river to generate hydroelectricity. The dams ended the tidal bore which altered the flow of water in the Amazon, and caused significant land erosion and damage to the Bailique Archipelago.

The river flows through the Uatuma-Trombetas moist forests ecoregion.
The river defines the western boundary of the  Amapá National Forest, a sustainable use conservation unit created in 1989.

See also
List of rivers of Amapá

References

Rivers of Amapá